Arno van Zwam (born 16 September 1969) is a Dutch former professional footballer who played as a goalkeeper for several clubs, most notably Fortuna Sittard.

Van Zwam made his debut in professional football playing for the Fortuna Sittard squad in the 1992. He also played for Júbilo Iwata in the J1 League between 2000 and 2003 before joining NAC Breda, ending his professional career in 2007.

Club statistics

Honours

Individual Honors
J.League Best XI: 2001

References

External links

1969 births
Living people
People from West Maas en Waal
Dutch footballers
Dutch expatriate footballers
Fortuna Sittard players
Júbilo Iwata players
J1 League players
Expatriate footballers in Japan
Dutch expatriate sportspeople in Japan
NAC Breda players
Eredivisie players
Eerste Divisie players
Association football goalkeepers
Footballers from Gelderland